Albizia gummifera is a species of legume in the family Fabaceae, native to sub-saharan Africa and Madagascar, and naturalized in
Brazil. It is also known as peacock flower.

It is recognisable as a very large deciduous, flat-topped tree reaching 24-27 metres in height and an attractive shape with thick branches. The largest specimens grow in wet or seasonally wet forest and closed woodland but it also thrives in some woodland areas with a notable dry season where it can be found at altitudes over 1500 metres. It grows best at moderate altitudes of around 700 - 1200 metres above sea level, but reaches down to below this at the southernmost extent of its range, in the Runde valley in Zimbabwe. It usually has a smooth bark, very rarely rough.

References

gummifera
Trees of Africa